The Canon EF 28–70mm 2.8L is an EF mount wide-to-normal zoom lens made by Canon from 1993 to 2002. It was replaced by the 24–70mm 2.8L.

Among standard zoom lenses, it is known for very good contrast and sharpness and for its extremely low chromatic aberration and barrel distortion. It has a metal body and neutral color rendition. Although discontinued since 2002 it is still a high ranking lens according to DxOMark among Canon zoom lenses and other standard zoom lenses. Like many other zoom lenses, it exhibits some barrel distortion at the wide end of its range.

A unique aspect of the 28–70 mm 2.8L (and 24–70 mm 2.8L) is that its barrel extends as it zooms toward its shortest focal length. When used with the supplied "petaled" lens hood, which attaches to a non-moving part of the lens, this extension results in a properly matched shade at every angle of view. Most zoom lens hoods are designed for only the widest angle of view, offering progressively inadequate shade at longer focal lengths.

Canon Standard Zoom Series
 Canon EF 28–135mm 3.5–5.6 IS USM
 Canon EF 17–40mm 4L USM
 Canon EF 24–70mm2.8L USM
 Canon EF 24–105mm 4 IS USM

References

 EF28-70mm f/2.8L USM at the Canon Camera Museum
 Canon Europe product page
 DP Review news report

Canon EF lenses
Canon L-Series lenses
Products introduced in 1993